Hybrid aircraft can refer to:
 Hybrid airship
 hybrid electric aircraft, an aircraft with an hybrid electric powertrain